Hove is a railway station in Hove, just south of the city of Antwerp, Antwerp, Belgium. The station opened in 1888 on the Line 25 and Line 27.

Train services
The station is served by the following services:

Brussels RER services (S1) Antwerp - Mechelen - Brussels - Waterloo - Nivelles (weekdays)
Brussels RER services (S1) Antwerp - Mechelen - Brussels (weekends)

External links
belgianrail.be
De Lijn website

Railway stations opened in 1888
Railway stations in Belgium
Railway stations in Antwerp Province